Dagger (Persian title: Deshneh – ) is a 1972 Iranian drama romance film directed by Fereydun Gole and starring Behrouz Vossoughi, Forouzan, Jalal Pishvaeian and Hossein Gil.

Cast 
 Behrouz Vossoughi – Abbas
 Hossein Gil – Mohammad
 Forouzan -
 Jalal Pishvaeian
 Hossein Shahab

External links

References

1972 films
Iranian black-and-white films
1972 romantic drama films
1970s Persian-language films
Iranian romantic drama films